Nuk or NUK may refer to:

Places 
 Nuk, Bajestan, a village in Bajestan County, Razavi Khorasan Province, Iran
 Nuk, Rashtkhvar, a village in Rashtkhvar County, Razavi Khorasan Province, Iran
 Nuk, Birjand, a village in South Khorasan Province, Iran
 Nuk, Sarbisheh, a village in South Khorasan Province, Iran
 Nuk, Tabas, a village in South Khorasan Province, Iran

People 
 nickname of DeAndre Hopkins (born 1992), American National Football League player
 Nuk Korako (born 1953/1954), New Zealand politician

Other uses 
 NUK (brand), a German brand of baby products
 Nuk language, spoken in Papua New Guinea
 nuk, ISO 639-3 code for the Nuu-chah-nulth language of British Columbia, Canada
 National and University Library of Slovenia
 National University of Kaohsiung, Kaohsiung City, Taiwan
 Norwegian Air UK, a British airline
 Nuuk Idraetslag, also known as NÛK, a sports club based in Nuuk, Greenland
 Nuk, a fictional wolf in Balto II: Wolf Quest; see List of Balto characters

See also 
 Nuuk, the capital of Greenland
 Nuq (disambiguation)
 Nuc (disambiguation)
 Nuck (disambiguation)